Nduka Odizor and Christo van Rensburg were the defending champions, but did not participate together this year.  Odizor partnered Bryan Shelton, losing in the semifinals.  van Rensburg partnered John-Laffnie de Jager, losing in the first round.

David Rikl and Michiel Schapers won the title, defeating Javier Frana and Leonardo Lavalle 6–2, 6–7, 6–3 in the final.

Seeds

  Javier Frana /  Leonardo Lavalle (final)
  David Rikl /  Michiel Schapers (champions)
  Nduka Odizor /  Bryan Shelton (semifinals)
  Andrew Castle /  Paul Wekesa  (first round)

Draw

Draw

External links
Draw

Tel Aviv Open
1991 ATP Tour